Alphonse-Louis du Plessis de Richelieu (1582 – 23 March 1653) was a French Carthusian, bishop and Cardinal. He was the elder brother of Armand Cardinal Richelieu, the celebrated minister of Louis XIII.

He was educated at the Collège de Navarre. He refused the position of Bishop of Luçon, practically in the gift of his family. His harsh censorship drove Renė Descartes out of France.

He was archbishop of Aix in 1626, archbishop of Lyon in 1628. He was created cardinal in 1629. He was named Grand Almoner of France in 1631 and presided over the funeral of King Louis XIII in June 1644. He participated in the 1644 papal conclave which elected Pope Innocent X.

He died on 23 March 1653 in Lyon.

References

Bibliography
 
 Charléty, S. (1902). "Lyon sous le ministère de Richelieu". Revue d'histoire moderne et contemporaine (1899-1914), Vol. 3, No. 2 (1901/1902), pp. 121–136;  Vol. 3, No. 5 (1901/1902), pp. 493–507.  
 Deloche, Maximin (1935). Un frère de Richelieu inconnu. Paris: Desclée.  
 
 Péricaud, Marc-Antoine (1829). Notice historique sur Alphonse-Louis du Plessis de Richelieu, archevêque de Lyon sous Louis XIII et Louis XIV, suivie d'une Relation de la peste de Lyon en 1638 et 1639. Lyon: Barret, 1829.

External links

Biography

1582 births
1653 deaths
Carthusians
17th-century French cardinals
Cardinals created by Pope Urban VIII
University of Paris alumni
Archbishops of Lyon